Sean Ethan Owen (1980–2004) was a gay American man who was murdered in Durham, North Carolina in February 2004. Owen's body was found in the Eno River after he was shot twice and apparently left for dead.

Matthew Taylor, Derrick Maiden, and Shelton Epps met Owen through a gay.com chatroom and lured him from his hometown of Franklinton to Durham, where they intended to rob him and steal his car. When Owen attempted to escape, they shot him twice in the head and disposed of his body in the Eno River, where it was found on February 21, 2004. The shooter, Shelton Epps, was convicted of first degree murder and sentenced to life imprisonment, as was Matthew Taylor. Derrick Maiden testified against Taylor and Epps as part of a plea bargain.

The circumstances of Owen's murder were linked to the murders of other gay men that were connected to the gay.com chatrooms. Police denied a connection between the murders, although some viewed the murders as hate crimes against LGBT people. Bloggers have since compared Owen's murder to highly publicized LGBT hate crimes like the murders of Matthew Shepard and Brandon Teena.

References

1980 births
2004 deaths
2004 murders in the United States
American murder victims
Deaths by firearm in North Carolina
LGBT people from North Carolina
People from Franklinton, North Carolina
People murdered in North Carolina
Violence against gay men in the United States
Violence against men in North America
20th-century LGBT people